McConalogue (Irish: Mac Conaill Óig or Mac Dhomhnaill Óig) is a surname. Notable people with the surname include:

Charlie McConalogue (born 1977), Irish politician
Stephen McConalogue (born 1981), Scottish footballer

Anglicised Irish-language surnames